Iron Creek is a stream in Alberta, Canada. It is a tributary of the Battle River.

Iron Creek received its name from the Cree Indians of the area, on account of an iron meteorite unearthed near its course.

See also
List of rivers of Alberta

References

Rivers of Alberta